Inwood is a city in Lyon County, Iowa, United States. The population was 928 at the time of the 2020 census.

Geography
Inwood's longitude and latitude coordinates in decimal form are 43.308770, -96.432531.

Demographics

2010 census
As of the census of 2010, there were 814 people, 341 households, and 236 families living in the city. The racial makeup of the city was 97.9% White, 0.1% Native American, 0.1% Asian, 1.2% from other races, and 0.6% from two or more races. Hispanic or Latino of any race were 1.4% of the population.

There were 341 households, of which 27.3% had children under the age of 18 living with them, 61.9% were married couples living together, 4.1% had a female householder with no husband present, 3.2% had a male householder with no wife present, and 30.8% were non-families. 27.3% of all households were made up of individuals, and 15% had someone living alone who was 65 years of age or older. The average household size was 2.29 and the average family size was 2.75.

The median age in the city was 41.3 years. 21.9% of residents were under the age of 18; 7.6% were between the ages of 18 and 24; 22.9% were from 25 to 44; 22.9% were from 45 to 64; and 24.7% were 65 years of age or older. The gender makeup of the city was 49.0% male and 51.0% female.

2000 census
As of the census of 2000, there were 875 people, 334 households, and 234 families living in the city. The racial makeup of the city was 97.26% White, 0.46% African American, 0.11% Native American, 0.11% Asian, 1.03% from other races, and 1.03% from two or more races. Hispanic or Latino of any race were 1.83% of the population.

There were 334 households, out of which 32.6% had children under the age of 18 living with them, 63.5% were married couples living together, 5.4% had a female householder with no husband present, and 29.9% were non-families. 29.0% of all households were made up of individuals, and 18.3% had someone living alone who was 65 years of age or older. The average household size was 2.48 and the average family size was 3.07.

In the city, the population was spread out, with 26.4% under the age of 18, 7.5% from 18 to 24, 23.5% from 25 to 44, 16.8% from 45 to 64, and 25.7% who were 65 years of age or older. The median age was 40 years. For every 100 females, there were 84.2 males. For every 100 females age 18 and over, there were 84.0 males.

The median income for a household in the city was $33,889, and the median income for a family was $41,667. Males had a median income of $29,408 versus $23,611 for females. The per capita income for the city was $15,651. About 6.8% of families and 7.9% of the population were below the poverty line, including 8.5% of those under age 18 and 7.6% of those age 65 or over.

Notable people

 Robert A. Dahl, (1915-2014) political scientist and Sterling professor at Yale.
 Kyle Vanden Bosch (1978– ) defensive end for the Detroit Lions, a West Lyon Community School graduate, from Larchwood, Iowa

References

External links

 
Inwood, Iowa Portal style community website
City-Data Comprehensive statistical data and more about Inwood

Cities in Iowa
Cities in Lyon County, Iowa